Jawaharlal Nehru Technological University may refer to:
 Jawaharlal Nehru Technological University, Hyderabad
 Jawaharlal Nehru Technological University, Kakinada
 Jawaharlal Nehru Technological University, Anantapur
 Jawaharlal Nehru Technological University, Ramagundam
 Jawaharlal Nehru Technological University, Sultanpur

See also 
 Jawaharlal Nehru University